Capcom Fighting Collection is a fighting game compilation by Capcom in celebration of the Street Fighter series' 35th anniversary. The collection includes arcade versions of ten fighting games originally released by Capcom between 1994 and 2003, including all five Darkstalkers games. It was released on June 24, 2022 on Nintendo Switch, PlayStation 4, Windows, and Xbox One.

Gameplay 
Capcom Fighting Collection is a compilation of arcade versions of ten fighting games originally developed and published by Capcom. Most prominently, all five arcade entries in the Darkstalkers franchise are included, marking the first time the full series will be made available outside Japan. The collection also includes Red Earth for its first ever release outside arcades. The compilation features online play with rollback netcode, training and spectator modes, save states, concept art, design documents, and a music player. Similar to Darkstalkers Resurrection, the compilation will not have the extra/boss playable characters featured from the home console versions, unlike the Japanese-only release Vampire: Darkstalkers Collection.

 Darkstalkers:
 Darkstalkers: The Night Warriors (1994)
 Night Warriors: Darkstalkers' Revenge (1995)
 Vampire Savior: The Lord of Vampire (1997)
 Vampire Hunter 2: Darkstalkers' Revenge (1997)
 Vampire Savior 2: The Lord of Vampire (1997)
 Pocket Fighter:
 Super Puzzle Fighter II Turbo (1996)
 Super Gem Fighter Mini Mix (1997)
 Other games:
 Cyberbots: Full Metal Madness (1995)
 Red Earth (1996)
 Hyper Street Fighter II: The Anniversary Edition (2003)

Release 
The game was released on June 24, 2022 on Nintendo Switch, PlayStation 4, Windows, and Xbox One. A special physical edition will include Street Fighter 30th Anniversary Collection exclusively in Japan. Pre-Orders & Early Purchases Of The Collection Include Digital Codes of All New Music Remixes, Original & Exclusive Illustrations, & Three Wonders Game For Capcom Arcade 2nd Stadium. The remastered however, removed a secret ending.

On September 27, 2022, a free update was released for all versions. This update includes adding quality of life features, making existing features more robust, bug fixes both for the collection as a whole and the original games, and some console exclusive changes like ID tags on PlayStation 4 and a bug involving the online leaderboard on Nintendo Switch.

Reception 

Capcom Fighting Collection received "generally favorable" reviews, according to review aggregator Metacritic.

GameSpot and Hardcore Gamer praised the approachability of the added mechanics, "perfect" port quality of the compilation, and Red Earth's inclusion, but felt the compilation lacked variety with the overrepresentation of the Darkstalkers franchise, and lamented the exclusion of more forgotten Capcom fighting games. IGN gave heavy praise to the modern rollback netcode and the inclusion of "an impressive museum filled with interesting art and music, and a snappy UI linking everything together", but took minor issue with the absence of cross-platform play and the exclusion of Street Fighter III. Nintendo Life lauded the compilation's "excellent, polished, and accurate" presentation, inclusion of the Darkstalkers franchise and Red Earth, and the "excellent" online net-code. The site also criticized the exclusion of inaccessible titles and the lack of both in-game soft resets and untranslated text in the Vampire Savior games. Push Square was similarly impressed by the game, giving it 9 stars out of 10, but thought the gallery content lacked contextualization and that Cyberbots was a poor inclusion. Shacknews liked the additions made to the game, including online play, a lobby system, training modes, and save states, but noted the exclusion of quality of life features from certain games, lack of crossplay, and that some games were "arcade-hard" by default. TouchArcade felt that the Switch version of the compilation included "a pretty good collection of games" but noted that "The overlap with other collections and my bad experiences with the online play keep me from recommending this too enthusiastically...this is still worth picking up for fans of Capcom's fighters."

Sales 
The Nintendo Switch version of Capcom Fighting Collection sold 3,433 physical copies in Japan during its first week of release, making it the fourteenth bestselling retail game of the week in the country. The PlayStation 4 version sold 2,798 physical copies in Japan throughout the same week, making it the sixteenth bestselling retail game in Japan throughout the week.

Notes

References

External links 
 Official website

2022 video games
Capcom video game compilations
Fighting games
Windows games
Nintendo Switch games
PlayStation 4 games
Xbox One games